Jim Henshaw (born September 28, 1949) is a Canadian actor, screenwriter and film and television producer.

Early life and education 
Henshaw was born in Bassano, Alberta, Canada. He graduated from the University of Saskatchewan.

Career 
A mainstay of the Canadian theatre scene during the 1970s, he appeared in more than 50 productions of new Canadian plays, including the first performances of several works by playwright George F. Walker. His film career included such films as The Last Detail, Monkeys in the Attic, Lions for Breakfast, The Supreme Kid and A Sweeter Song for which he also wrote the screenplay.

Henshaw was the voice of Daniel Mouse and Beaver Drummer in the 1978 animated film The Devil and Daniel Mouse, a television special created by Nelvana Productions, the Canadian animation company that worked on various television specials during this time from 1977 to 1980. In the field of animation, he is best known for playing Bright Heart Raccoon in The Care Bears Movie and The Care Bears Movie II: A New Generation, as well as Tenderheart Bear in The Care Bears Adventure in Wonderland and the television series The Care Bears Family.

He also starred in the Star Wars-inspired animated series, Ewoks, as Wicket W. Warrick and provided voices for the animated feature Heavy Metal.

He also supplied the voice of Zipper Cat in the early version of The Get Along Gang and did voices in two early animated films by including The Magic of Herself the Elf and Easter Fever. Henshaw has also made a guest appearance in two episodes of The Littlest Hobo.

In 1986, he transitioned his career into writing and producing, serving as a story editor or producer on such series as Adderly, Friday the 13th: The Series, Top Cops, War of the Worlds, Eerie, Indiana: The Other Dimension and BeastMaster. In addition to creating Top Cops, he has written more than a dozen television pilots, including Secret Service and The Lost World. He was also the creative force behind a successful series of romance films based on Harlequin Romance novels.

In addition to writing and producing, Henshaw is also the author of the Canadian show business and writing blog "The Legion of Decency".

Filmography

Film

Television

References

External links

 The Legion of Decency, Jim Henshaw's personal blog

1949 births
Living people
Canadian male television actors
Canadian male film actors
Canadian male voice actors
Canadian television writers
People from the County of Newell
Male actors from Alberta
Canadian bloggers
University of Saskatchewan alumni
Canadian male television writers
Male bloggers
21st-century Canadian screenwriters